Ronald Kwaku Dei Appiah better known by his stage name Bisa Kdei is a Ghanaian native solo singer and record producer from Eastern Region.

Music career

Bisa Kdei is the first Ghanaian artiste to break into the limelight with a movie soundtrack.

Musically, Bisa Kdei has had successful collaborations with top musicians in Ghana, Africa and the World at large. Some of these Ghanaian musicians Bisa Kdei has worked with include Sarkodie, D-Black, Efya, Obrafour, Kwaw Kese, M.anifest, Stonebwoy, Medikal, Becca, E.L, R2Bees, Samini, Irene Logan, Kofi Nti, DeeVS, Keche, Lighter, Patoranking, Reekado Banks, Lola Rae, Tach-Noir, JRio and others.

Bisa Kdei self-produced some of these collaborations from his studio; Chingam by Sarkodie, One of Your Own by Efya, Pimpinaa by Obrafour, etc.

Bisa Kdei has cited Nana Ampadu, J.A. Adofo, Dr. Paa Bobo, Daddy Lumba, Nana Acheampong and others as his musical inspirations.

Bisa Kdei has stated that he hopes to transform lives not just in Africa, but the rest of the world and above all, to raise the flag of Ghana and be one of the strong pillars people can think of.

International collaboration 
In November 2020, Bisa Kdei's remix of his "Asew" song originally released in 2018 was used as a soundtrack in Netflix's 2020 Christmas movie, "Jingle Jangle" He was recruited and composed a music for the movie alongside Usher Raymond, John Legend, Phillip Lawrence, Davy Nathan and Michael Diskint. In August 2021, he met David E. Talbert and his wife Lyn Sisson Talbert who were the producers of the movie 'Jingle Jangle'.

Personal life

Bisa Kdei identifies himself as a Christian. He believes every religion has its own leader and with that, he loves and respects everyone regardless of religious differences. Bisa Kdei reflected his Christian faith in his Gospel song titled "Give It To Baba". On several media platforms, Bisa Kdei has stated, "I give it all to God because he is the reason I am here now."

It was allegedly reported that Bisa Kdei and Becca were in a secret relationship. The two musicians have denied claims by the media.

Bisa Kdei lost his mother on August 19, 2015, inside Cocoa Clinic. The same day he released the music video for his single, "Mansa".

On March 14, 2018, Bisa Kdei was featured on the cover of WatsUp Magazine.

Social media hack

Bisa Kdei's verified Facebook account with over 574,000 followers as well as his Instagram account was hacked on October 29, 2015. Bisa posted on Twitter confirming the hack and that his media team was working to get it resolved. The hackers posted several sexually suggestive videos and pictures on his page. His Instagram account was shut down and a new account was created.

Discography

Bisa Kdei on December 21, 2013, launched his 16 track debut album on iTunes, Spotify, Amazon and other international music marketing platforms as well as the local markets.  The album, Thanksgiving, debuted at or near number one in Ghana. It was preceded by the single "Odo Carpenter".

On June 16, 2015, Bisa Kdei released the lead single, "Mansa", off his second album Breakthrough. The song paved way for a successful second studio album, which was released on December 18, 2015, under his record label, Black Legendary Music. The album which has 10 songs is available on all music selling platforms.

Bisa Kdei began to work on his next album. He released "Life", a song which features award-winning Nigerian artiste Patoranking, as a single. Two additional songs were released on April 19, 2017, titled "Apae", and "Feeling", the latter featuring Reekado Banks. Bisa Kdei released the album Highlife Konnect in 2018. The album is aimed at connecting him and other African artists, and to exposing the culture to the world.

Videography

Filmography

Awards and nominations

References

39. Bisa Kdei Goes After Fan With Savage Reply campusfilla.net. 2020-06-06 Retrieved

External links 
 Twitter
 Facebook
 Instagram

Living people
Ghanaian rappers
1986 births
21st-century Ghanaian male singers
21st-century Ghanaian singers